Bunjirō Kotō (April 8, 1856 - March 8, 1935) was a Japanese earth scientist (Geologist). He is from Iwami Province (Shimane Prefecture). Kotō is from Tokyo Imperial University, and after graduating, he became a professor at Tokyo Imperial University. He is known for taking photographs of the Neodani Fault when he investigated the 1891 Mino–Owari earthquake.

See also 

 Kotoite (小藤石)
1891 Mino–Owari earthquake (Neodani Fault)

References

External links 

 Kotoite (mindat.org) 
 Kotoite Mineral Data (webmineral.com)

Japanese geologists
Japanese geographers
Academic staff of the University of Tokyo
Recipients of the Order of the Sacred Treasure, 1st class
Recipients of the Order of the Sacred Treasure, 2nd class
Recipients of the Order of the Sacred Treasure, 4th class
People from Shimane Prefecture
1856 births
1935 deaths